Acrobasis blanchardorum is a species of snout moth in the genus Acrobasis. It was described by Herbert H. Neunzig in 1973 and is known from North America, including the type location of Texas.

The larvae feed on Quercus species including Quercus grisea.

References

Moths described in 1973
Acrobasis
Moths of North America